Socotá is a town and municipality in the Valderrama Province, part of the Colombian department of Boyacá. The municipality is situated in the Eastern Ranges of the Colombian Andes. It borders Jericó and Sativanorte in the north, Pisba and Mongua in the south, Chita and Támara, Casanare in the east and Sativasur, Tasco, Socha and Gámeza in the west.

Etymology 
The name Socotá comes from Chibcha and means either "Land of the Sun and farmfields" or "Good harvest".

History 
Before the Spanish conquest, Socotá was the northeasternmost part of the loose Muisca Confederation. It was ruled either by the iraca of Sugamuxi or by the Tundama based in Tundama.

Modern Socotá was founded on January 19, 1602 by Gonzalo Sanchez de Flandes.

Economy 
Main economic activity of Socotá is livestock farming and on a minor scale coal mining.

Named after Socotá 
 Socotá Formation, Lower Cretaceous sandstone and shale formation

References 

Municipalities of Boyacá Department
Populated places established in 1602
1602 establishments in the Spanish Empire
Muisca Confederation
Muysccubun